Kelly Barnes is an Australian Paralympic swimmer.  At the 1992 Barcelona Games, she won two silver medals in the Women's 100 m Butterfly S9 and Women's 200 m Medley SM9 events.  Barnes also competed in the 1994 Commonwealth Games, where she won a Bronze Medal in the Women's 100m Freestyle S9 event.

References

Female Paralympic swimmers of Australia
Swimmers at the 1992 Summer Paralympics
Swimmers at the 1994 Commonwealth Games
Commonwealth Games bronze medallists for Australia
Paralympic silver medalists for Australia
Living people
Medalists at the 1992 Summer Paralympics
Commonwealth Games medallists in swimming
Year of birth missing (living people)
Paralympic medalists in swimming
Australian female freestyle swimmers
Australian female butterfly swimmers
Australian female medley swimmers
S9-classified Paralympic swimmers
20th-century Australian women
21st-century Australian women
Medallists at the 1994 Commonwealth Games